War in the Gulf is a third game in the tank combat series, following from Team Yankee and Pacific Islands. The game imagines a situation in which Iraq invades Kuwait for a second time.

The player commands the platoon of 16 tanks presented on screen split in four pieces. Each piece is a command center for four units. The player must control the tanks by moving them and shooting on arcade screen and planning their moves on the tactical screen. Action is purely mouse-driven. A major consideration involves destroying buildings for money and preventing other from being destroyed.

External links
War in the Gulf entry at MobyGames
War in the Gulf entry at The Hall of Light

1993 video games
Amiga games
Atari ST games
DOS games
Tank simulation video games
Video game sequels
Video games developed in the United Kingdom
Video games set in Kuwait
Empire Interactive games